The 2020 ARCA Menards Series East was the 34th season of the ARCA Menards Series East, a regional stock car racing series sanctioned by NASCAR. It began on February 10 at New Smyrna Speedway with the Skip's Western Outfitters 175, and concluded on October 11 at Five Flags Speedway with the Pensacola 200. 2020 marked the first season the series was known as the ARCA Menards Series East, after it was known as the NASCAR K&N Pro Series East for the previous ten years. 

Sam Mayer entered the season as the defending champion, and won all but one race to score his second consecutive championship in the series.

When the season was put on hold due to the COVID-19 pandemic, drivers from all NASCAR series, including a few ARCA drivers, participated in the inaugural eNASCAR iRacing Pro Invitational Series during that time.

Teams and drivers

Complete schedule

Limited schedule

Notes

Changes

Teams
 Perennial ARCA Menards Series team Venturini Motorsports entered the series in advance of the 2020 season.
 Cook-Finley Racing announced an entry with Parker Retzlaff as the driver of the No. 42.

Drivers
 On November 20, 2019, it was announced that Nick Sanchez would be driving full-time and for rookie of the year in the East Series for Rev Racing in 2020. 
 On December 11, 2019, it was announced that Giovanni Bromante would drive full-time for Visconti Motorsports, running for rookie of the year in the No. 74 car. 
 On December 14, 2019, it was announced that Mason Diaz would drive the Venturini Motorsports car for the full season as part of the team's expansion into the East Series. 
 On December 16, 2019, it was announced that Tanner Gray would be moving up to the Truck Series full-time with DGR-Crosley, who he had driven for full-time in 2019 in the East Series in their No. 15 car. However, he ran a part-time schedule of races in ARCA East in 2020.
 On December 18, 2019, it was announced that Taylor Gray would run full-time and for rookie of the year in the No. 17 for DGR-Crosley in all races after he turned 15 on March 25, 2020. 
 On January 16, 2020, it was announced that Corey Heim would be driving in three races for Venturini Motorsports.
 On January 30, 2020, it was announced that Parker Retzlaff would be driving the No. 42 for Cook-Finley Racing part-time with the possibility of a full season. He drove the No. 74 Visconti Motorsports entry part-time in 2019.
 On February 6, 2020, Rette Jones Racing announced that Tristan Van Wieringen would drive the No. 30 full-time and for rookie of the year with the team.  However, due to the financial impact after COVID-19, the team ran select races instead of full-time.
 On February 7, 2020, it was announced that Daniel Dye would be making his series debut in the East Series at New Smyrna Speedway, driving for Ben Kennedy in his No. 43. Dye was also scheduled to run select races in 2020.
 On March 10, 2020, it was announced that Derek Griffith would be running the full season and for rookie of the year with Chad Bryant Racing in the team's No. 2 car. However, due to the financial impact after COVID-19, the team ran select races instead of full-time, even though Griffith would run a second car, the 22.

Manufacturers
 On December 11, 2019, DGR-Crosley announced a switch from Toyota to Ford beginning in 2020.

Schedule
On November 6, 2019, NASCAR released the schedule for the 2020 season. As part of the unification of the former K&N East and West series with the ARCA Menards Series, the schedule decreased from fourteen races in 2019 to eight races in 2020. The number of races was originally seven, however, an additional race at Fairgrounds Speedway was announced on December 14, 2019.

The races at Memphis International Raceway, Iowa Speedway, Watkins Glen International as well as Bristol Motor Speedway's second race were taken and moved from the East Series schedule to the ARCA Menards Series schedule. New Hampshire Motor Speedway, which had two East Series races in 2019, retained only one race in 2020. Five Flags Speedway, Fairgrounds Speedway and Toledo Speedway were added to the East Series schedule, moving over from the ARCA schedule. Berlin Raceway, which hosted  an East Series race in 2017, was added back. The races at South Boston Speedway and World Wide Technology Raceway were completely dropped from the schedule. 

NBCSN carried television coverage of all races on a tape-delay basis.

 Races highlighted in gold are combination events with the ARCA Menards Series.

Schedule changes due to the COVID-19 pandemic
The event at Five Flags Speedway, originally scheduled for March 14, was postponed to October 10 due to the COVID-19 pandemic.  On August 25, 2020, series officials announced the cancellation of races at Berlin Raceway and New Hampshire Motor Speedway and replaced them with a date at Toledo Speedway, which served as a combination race with the ARCA Menards Series. The race at Fairgrounds Speedway was also cancelled.

Results and standings

Races

Drivers' championship

Note: The pole-winner also receives 1 bonus point, similar to the previous ARCA points system used until 2019 and unlike NASCAR.

(key) Bold – Pole position awarded by time. Italics – Pole position set by final practice results or rainout. * – Most laps led.

See also
 2020 NASCAR Cup Series
 2020 NASCAR Xfinity Series
 2020 NASCAR Gander RV & Outdoors Truck Series
 2020 ARCA Menards Series
 2020 ARCA Menards Series West
 2020 NASCAR Whelen Modified Tour
 2020 NASCAR Pinty's Series
 2020 NASCAR Whelen Euro Series
 2020 eNASCAR iRacing Pro Invitational Series
 2020 EuroNASCAR Esports Series

References

ARCA Menards Series
2020 in American motorsport
ARCA Menards East